The Municipality of Glenella – Lansdowne is a rural municipality (RM) in the Canadian province of Manitoba.

History

It was incorporated on January 1, 2015 via the amalgamation of the RMs of Glenella and Lansdowne. It was formed as a requirement of The Municipal Amalgamations Act, which required that municipalities with a population less than 1,000 amalgamate with one or more neighbouring municipalities by 2015. The Government of Manitoba initiated these amalgamations in order for municipalities to meet the 1997 minimum population requirement of 1,000 to incorporate a municipality.

Communities 
 Glenella
 Waldersee

Demographics 

References 

2015 establishments in Manitoba
Manitoba municipal amalgamations, 2015
Populated places established in 2015
Rural municipalities in Manitoba